Kanjon opasnih igara is a 1998 Croatian film directed by Vladimir Tadej. It is based on Hrvoje Hitrec's novel of the same name.

The cast also includes Luka Peroš best known for his role of Marseille in Money Heist.

References

External links
 

1998 films
1990s Croatian-language films
Films based on Croatian novels
Croatian children's films
Yugoslav Wars films
Works about the Croatian War of Independence